Higher Ground is a drama television series created by Michael Braverman and Matthew Hastings. The series follows a group of troubled and abused high school students at a therapeutic boarding school in the Pacific Northwest as they navigate adolescence in the aftermath of their home troubles.

Higher Ground first premiered in the U.S on the Fox Family network on January 14, 2000. Although praised for its themes and performances (particulary Christensen’s) and well-rated, the series was cancelled after its first season due to the sale of its broadcast network the following year. The show was part of a production company that did not make it to the new network.

Synopsis 
Located high in the mountains of the Northwestern United States and 25 miles from the nearest town, Mount Horizon High School is a harbor for at-risk teenagers from their troubled pasts. The series focuses on one group of teens, the "Cliffhangers," who, with the aid of school counselors and each other, navigate adolescence as they learn to overcome their fears and face their inner demons. Providing them with not only a standard high school education, but also a rigorous schedule of outdoor activities and the tools they need in the aftermath of their abuse, the students work towards gaining confidence to face their personal struggles. While navigating demanding physical challenges, friendships, and romantic entanglements, the students (and some teachers) find Mount Horizon's world much safer than their turbulent home lives have been.

The students tackle issues such as substance abuse, depression, neglect, sexual, physical and verbal abuse, self-harm, eating disorders, gang violence, learning disabilities, and suicide.

Characters

Students 

 Scott Barringer (portrayed by Hayden Christensen)
Scott is a 16-year-old football star who plays the piano and excels in athletics. Scott is the only child of divorced parents. When Scott was 15, his father married a young woman who was closer to his age than her husband's. This new stepmother began sexually abusing Scott. Afraid of what his father's reaction might be if the abuse was revealed, Scott immersed himself in drugs and his life fell into a downward spiral. His school work suffered and he was thrown off the football team, endangering his future as a college athlete. As a last resort, his father decided to send him to Horizon. As the "new kid" at Horizon, Scott begins to discover the stories of his classmates, as well as learn how to deal with his past.

 Shelby Merrick (portrayed by A. J. Cook) 
The daughter of a neglectful and indifferent mother and sexually abusive step-father, Shelby began running away from home at the age of 15. Living on the streets and always on the run, Shelby turned to prostitution as means of survival, and began abusing drugs. Regardless of Shelby's lengths, her mother eventually located her and took her home. However, upon finding that she could no longer control Shelby, nor help her with her emotional problems, Shelby's mother sent her daughter to Mount Horizon. At Horizon, Shelby has a bitter and sarcastic attitude, taking her pain out on others and creating several negative relationships with many students. As the series progresses, Shelby slowly starts opening up to Scott, Daisy, and the counselors.

 Katherine Ann "Kat" Cabot (portrayed by Kandyse McClure)
Katherine is an adopted African American child of white parents. Even though she was always aware of her adoption, a sense of alienation set in as she grew older, and Katherine felt she didn't fit in or belong. That confusion caused her grades to slip and for her to withdraw from her talents as a gifted athlete. The accidental death of Katherine's sister, Shannon, the biological daughter of her adoptive parents, traumatized her and contributed to her lapse into depression. Sent by her parents to Horizon, Katherine is the oldest of the Cliffhangers, often acting as a mother-figure and form of guidance to her younger classmates. However, Katherine learns that she cannot always have the Cliffhangers leaning on her for support, and that she sometimes needs to rely on others for help.

 Augusto "Auggie" Ciceros (portrayed by Jorgito Vargas Jr.)
Auggie came to Horizon to avoid a Youth Authority lockup. The youngest of five children, Auggie grew up in a middle-class home on the fringe of the barrio. Although not a gang member, he was a tagger and had gained an impressive reputation. Eventually he was busted, but the court took mercy on Auggie who, at 16, could barely read or write. All through school, he was placed in educable mentally handicapped classes despite being very intelligent. Adjudicated to Horizon, Auggie's teachers there realized the real problem: profound dyslexia. Although good-natured, Auggie often finds himself in bouts of anger and conflict with both himself and other students at Horizon. Auggie struggles with self-confidence, regularly believing himself to be stupid and a lost cause, and must begin to understand that his educational difficulties do not have to define who he is.

 Juliette Waybourne (portrayed by Meghan Ory)
Hiding her depression behind a façade of smiles forced upon her by her emotionally abusive and distant mother, Juliette is often referred to as "Princess" and "Queenie" by Shelby, which is derived from her appearance and behavior, and "Twig" by the rest of the Cliffhangers, due to her weight. Growing up, Juliette continually assaulted and abused herself by means such as bulimia and self-harm. Juliette's narcissistic mother, who has had many husbands over the years, consistently verbally and emotionally abused Juliette during her youth. Unable to achieve the standards set by her mother, nor control any other aspect of her life, Juliette chose physically destructive measures to get the love and attention she craved. After she was sent to the hospital emergency room twice, where she had tubes forced down her throat as a result of anorexia, bulimia and abusing laxatives, Juliette was brought to Mount Horizon. Juliette struggles to understand that her mother's demands of "Why couldn't you be the perfect daughter?" are not her own fault.

 Ezra Friedkin (portrayed by Kyle Downes)
Ezra was adopted at birth by parents who were looking more for a solution to their marital difficulties than for a child to love. When the marriage ended in divorce, Ezra was caught in the middle of his parents' arguments. The experience forced him to be a pleaser, a mediator, a peacemaker, and a rule-follower. To comfort himself, Ezra turned to drugs and began abusing ketamine, on which he nearly overdosed. After Ezra was revived in the ER and spent 10 days recovering, he was sent to Horizon. Although witty and charming, Ezra struggles with his self-confidence and emotional stability in the shadow his parents' divorce cast upon him.

 Daisy Lipenowski (portrayed by Jewel Staite)
Disguising herself beneath a mask of Gothic makeup, black-coloured dark clothing, and body piercings, and finding an interest in tarot cards and death, Daisy refers to herself as Daisy Graves. The only child of wealthy alcoholics, Daisy suffered from years of emotional abuse in her home and believed herself to be an inconvenience to her parents' addiction. When the verbal abuse she faced began to threaten her physically, Daisy assaulted her father with a seven-iron golf club, and was quickly sent to Horizon. Insightful and harshly honest, Daisy carefully hides her own inner pain and rage behind arrogance and a morbid sense of humor.

Counselors 

 Peter Scarbrow (portrayed by Joe Lando)
Peter has been the headmaster and chief administrator of Mt. Horizon High School for the past three years. In cooperation with the school's owner and founder, Frank Markasian, he has built Horizon to one of the finest, most progressive and most successful "emotional growth" schools in the Pacific Northwest. Prior to meeting Frank, Peter had bottomed-out. To keep up with the incredible physical demands of the business after a success at one of the biggest brokerages on Wall Street, he, at 28 years old, turned to cocaine and then to heroin. Drugs ultimately led to divorce and when, after his first overdose and a stint at a rehabilitation clinic, he began using drugs again, Peter ended up on the streets. Recovering at a Washington hospital after another near-fatal overdose, he met Frank, whose philosophy struck a chord with Peter. The two men bonded and Frank invited him to Mount Horizon for recovery. Frank became Peter's mentor, best friend and surrogate father. Except for an occasional trip back to New York, he has remained at Mount Horizon ever since.

 Sophie Becker (portrayed by Anne Marie Loder)
Sophie met Peter Scarbrow during one of his drug rehabilitations and the two became friends—at least one of the reasons being their interest for adrenaline sports. Later Sophie departed abroad while Mount Horizon was established. When she came back, Peter, eager for her not to leave his life again, eventually coaxes her to become more involved at the school as teacher and counselor. Sophie agrees, taking over the position leader of the Cliffhangers, and their mutual affinity begins developing. During her time at Horizon, Sophie's own personal struggles slowly become apparent to not only Peter, but some of the students as well.

 Hannah Bower-Barnes (portrayed by Deborah Odell)
The original leader of the Cliffhangers, Hannah loved her students dearly and became very close with them, especially Kat and Auggie. However, Hannah struggled to balance her marriage with the emotional toll her demanding job took on her. Despite her many successes in aiding the teens, Hannah departs Horizon to fix her marriage after a devastating occurrence at the school.

Recurring characters 
 Dmitry Chepovetsky as Jeff (6 episodes)
 Brittney Irvin as Jess Merrick, Shelby's younger sister (2 episodes)
 Lynda Boyd as Alice Blaine, Jess and Shelby's mother (2 episodes)
 Jim Byrnes as Frank Markasian, who founded Horizon after his son committed suicide (5 episodes)
 Sean Campbell as Sheriff Curtis Swann (7 episodes)
 Kyle Alisharan as Hank, Kat's boyfriend (5 episodes)
 Benita Ha as Annie, who owns the local restaurant and lives with her 5-year-old daughter Gracie (7 episodes)
 Garwin Sanford as Martin Barringer, Scott's father (5 episodes)
 Emmanuelle Vaugier as Elaine Barringer, Scott's sexually abusive stepmother (4 episodes)
 Terence Kelly as Don Scarbrow, Peter's father (3 episodes)
 Suzy Joachim as Juliette's abusive mother (3 episodes)
 Kett Turton as D. David Ruxton, a new member of the Cliffhangers (3 episodes)
 Ingrid Torrance as Chloë, Peter's ex-wife (4 episodes)
 Jessica Marte as Gracie (3 episodes)
 Roger Cross as Roger Claypool, a worker at Horizon who retrieves children (4 episodes)

Episodes 
Higher Ground consists of 22 episodes, each of which features a quotation at the beginning. These quotes comes from famous writers, politicians and other significant persons.

Home media 
In 2015, Higher Ground was released through both Amazon and iTunes for purchase via digital download.

Production 
The series was shot in Vancouver, British Columbia. Production on at the series began in July 1999. The original name of the series was Cliffhangers. By November, the film crew had only 5–6 hours of daylight each day, shifting much of the dramatic action indoors during the middle episodes.

Fox Family and Lions Gate Films took advantage of tax incentive programs offered by the Canadian and British Columbia governments to reduce costs. The programs required that the bulk of production expenses, including salaries, be spent in Canada. Because of this, though American writers wrote all 22 of the episodes, Canadians directed all the episodes, and almost all the cast and crew were Canadian. 

Producers received support from other Canadian artists over the course of the series. Canadian songwriter Sarah McLachlan licensed her 1998 song “Angel” in its entirety for only C$10,000, the minimum allowable under her record company contract (the song plays at the end of Episode 2).

On May 4, 2000, producers received word that Hayden Christensen had been cast in the then-upcoming Star Wars film, Attack of the Clones (Lucasfilm made the official announcement on May 7). George Lucas became aware of Christensen when Christensen's agent sent him the pilot episode from Higher Ground. Higher Ground was cancelled after its first season due to the sale of its broadcast network the following year; the series was part of a production company that did not move to the new network. 

In 2003, WAM!, the family channel of the Starz Encore network, acquired all 22 episodes of season 1 for re-airing.

Notes

External links 
 

2000 American television series debuts
2000 Canadian television series debuts
2000 American television series endings
2000 Canadian television series endings
2000s American high school television series
2000s American teen drama television series
2000s Canadian high school television series
2000s Canadian teen drama television series
English-language television shows
Fox Family Channel original programming
Television series about teenagers
Television series by CBS Studios
Television series by Lionsgate Television
Television shows filmed in Vancouver
Self-harm in fiction
Coming-of-age television shows